Athletics events were held from 30 September 2022 to 4 October 2022 at IIT Gandhinagar, Athletic Track, Venue 3.

Medal table

Medal summary
Men
Track

Road

Field

Combined

References

2022 National Games of India
2022 in Indian sport
Lists of medalists in athletics
Athletics at multi-sport events
Athletics competitions in India
2022 in athletics (track and field)